Tom Bowers ( – March 2021) was a British-born Seychellois sculptor and photographer.

Life
Bowers was born in London, the United Kingdom where he studied graphic art and sculpture. He later worked as a freelance advertiser after he opened a photographic studio in London. In 1981, along with his family, he visited Seychelles on holiday before he decided to move into the country permanently in 1986.

In 2014, he was commissioned by the government of Seychelles to design the Liberty Monument which replaced the old Zom Libb monument. Bowers has a sculpture studio in Anse a la Mouche, Seychelles.

He died in March 2021, 84 years old.

References

1936 births
Living people
Seychellois sculptors
British expatriates in Seychelles
British male sculptors
20th-century British sculptors
21st-century British sculptors
21st-century male artists
20th-century British male artists
21st-century British male artists